A dugout canoe or simply dugout is a boat made from a hollowed out tree. Other names for this type of boat are logboat and monoxylon. Monoxylon (μονόξυλον) (pl: monoxyla) is Greek –  mono- (single) + ξύλον xylon (tree) – and is mostly used in classic Greek texts. In German, they are called Einbaum ("one tree" in English). Some, but not all, pirogues are also constructed in this manner.

Dugouts are the oldest boat type archaeologists have found, dating back about 8,000 years to the Neolithic Stone Age. This is probably because they are made of massive pieces of wood, which tend to preserve better than others, such as bark canoes. Along with bark canoes and hide kayaks, dugouts were also used by Indigenous peoples of the Americas.

Construction

Construction of a dugout begins with the selection of a log of suitable dimensions. Sufficient wood must be removed to make the vessel relatively light in weight and buoyant, yet still strong enough to support the crew and cargo. Specific types of wood were often preferred based on their strength, durability, and density. The shape of the boat is then fashioned to minimize drag, with sharp ends at the bow and stern.

First, the bark is removed from the exterior. Before the appearance of metal tools, dugouts were hollowed out using controlled fires. The burnt wood was then removed using an adze. Another method using tools is to chop out parallel notches across the interior span of the wood, then split out and remove the wood from between the notches. Once hollowed out, the interior was dressed and smoothed out with a knife or adze.

More primitive designs keep the tree's original dimensions, with a round bottom. However, it is possible to carefully steam the sides of the hollow log until they are pliable, then bend to create a more flat-bottomed "boat" shape with a wider beam in the centre.

For travel in the rougher waters of the ocean, dugouts can be fitted with outriggers. One or two smaller logs are mounted parallel to the main hull by long poles. In the case of two outriggers, one is mounted on either side of the hull.

Africa
The Dufuna canoe from Nigeria is an 8000-year-old dugout, the oldest boat discovered in Africa, and the third-oldest worldwide.
The well-watered tropical rainforest and woodland regions of sub-Saharan Africa provide both the waterways and the trees for dugout canoes, which are commonplace from the Limpopo River basin in the south through East and Central Africa and across to West Africa. African teak is the timber favoured for their construction, though this comprises a number of different species, and is in short supply in some areas. Dugouts are paddled across deep lakes and rivers or punted through channels in swamps (see makoro or mtumbwi) or in shallow areas, and are used for transport, fishing, and hunting, including, in the past, the very dangerous hunting of hippopotamus. Dugouts are called pirogues in Francophone areas of Africa.

A Nok sculpture portrays two individuals, along with their goods, in a dugout canoe. Both of the anthropomorphic figures in the watercraft are paddling. The Nok terracotta depiction of a dugout canoe may indicate that Nok people utilized dugout canoes to transport cargo, along tributaries (e.g., Gurara River) of the Niger River, and exchanged them in a regional trade network. The Nok terracotta depiction of a figure with a seashell on its head may indicate that the span of these riverine trade routes may have extended to the Atlantic Coast. In the maritime history of Africa, there is the earlier Dufuna canoe, which was constructed approximately 8000 years ago in the northern region of Nigeria; as the second earliest form of water vessel known in Sub-Saharan Africa, the Nok terracotta depiction of a dugout canoe was created in the central region of Nigeria during the first millennium BCE.

Asia

An 8000-year-old dugout canoe was found by archaeologists in Kuahuqiao, Zhejiang Province, in east China. This is the earliest canoe found in Asia.

The Moken, an ethnic group that lives in Myanmar's Mergui Archipelago and the north of Thailand as sea nomads, still builds and uses dugout canoes. According to the Moken's accounts of their people's origin, a mythical queen punished the forbidden love of their ancestral forefather for his sister-in-law by banishing him and his descendants to life on sea in dugout canoes with indentations fore and aft ("a mouth that eats and a rear that defecates"), symbolizing the unending cycle of ingestion, digestion and evacuation.

A centuries-old unfinished dugout boat, a big banca (five tons, measuring 8 by 2 by 1.5 meters) was accidentally retrieved on November, 2010 by Mayor Ricardo Revita at Barangay Casanicolasan, Rosales, Pangasinan, Philippines, in Lagasit River, near Agno River. It is now on display in front of the Municipal Town Hall.

Europe

In ancient Europe many dugouts were made from linden wood, for several reasons. First, linden trees were abundant in the Paleolithic after the melting of the Weichselian glaciation and readily available. Secondly, linden grew to be one of the tallest trees in the forests of the time, making it easier to build longer boats. Linden wood also lends itself well to carving and doesn't split or crack easily. It is also lighter than most other tree types in European old-growth forests, and for this reason, boats made from linden wood have a better cargo capacity and are easier to carry. 

The Pesse canoe, found in the Netherlands, is a dugout which is believed to be the world's oldest boat, carbon dated to between 8040 BCE and 7510 BCE. Other dugouts discovered in the Netherlands include two in the province of North Holland: in 2003, near Uitgeest, dated at 617-600 BC; and in 2007, near Den Oever, dated at 3300-3000 BC.

Dugouts have also been found in Germany. In German, the craft is known as Einbaum (one-tree). In the old Hanseatic town of Stralsund, three log-boats were excavated in 2002. Two of the boats were around 7,000 years old and are the oldest boats found in the Baltic area. The third boat (6,000 years old) was 12 meters long and holds the record as the longest dugout in the region. The finds have partly deteriorated due to poor storage conditions.

In 1991, remains of a linden wood log-boat of nearly 6 meters were found at Männedorf-Strandbad in Switzerland at Lake Zürich. The boat has since been dated to be 6,500 years old.

In 1902 an oak logboat over 15 m long and 1 m wide, was found at Addergoole Bog, Lurgan, County Galway, Ireland, and delivered to the National Museum of Ireland. The Lurgan boat radiocarbon date was 3940 +/- 25 BP. The boat has holes suggesting that it had an outrigger or was joined to another boat.

In 2012, at Parc Glyndwr, Monmouth, Monmouthshire, Wales, UK, an excavation by the Monmouth Archeological Society, revealed three ditches suggesting a Neolithic dugout trimaran of similar length to the Lurgan log boat, carbon dated to 3700+/-35 BP.

De Administrando Imperio details how the Slavs built monoxyla that they sold to Rus' in Kiev. These boats were then used against the Byzantine Empire during the Rus'–Byzantine Wars of the 9th and 10th centuries. They used dugouts to attack Constantinople and to withdraw into their lands with bewildering speed and mobility. Hence, the name of Δρομίται ("people on the run") applied to the Rus in some Byzantine sources. The monoxyla were often accompanied by larger galleys, that served as command and control centres. Each Slavic dugout could hold from 40 to 70 warriors.

The Cossacks of the Zaporozhian Host were also renowned for their artful use of dugouts, which issued from the Dnieper to raid the shores of the Black Sea in the 16th and 17th centuries. Using small, shallow-draft, and highly maneuverable galleys known as chaiky, they moved swiftly across the Black Sea. According to the Cossacks' own records, these vessels, carrying a 50 to 70 man crew, could reach the coast of Anatolia from the mouth of the Dnieper River in forty hours.

More than 40 pre-historic log-boats have been found in the Czech Republic. The latest discovery was in 1999 of a 10 m long log-boat in Mohelnice. It was cut out of a single oak log and has a width of 1.05 m. The log-boat has been dated to around 1000 BC and is kept at the Mohelnice Museum (Museum of National History). Geographically, Czech log-boat sites and remains are clustered along the Elbe and Morava rivers.

Poland is known for so-called Lewin-type log-boats, found at Lewin Brzeski, Koźle and Roszowicki Las accordingly, and associated with the Przeworsk culture in the early centuries CE. Lewin logboats are characterized by a square or trapezoidal cross-section, rectangular hull-ends and low height of the sides in relation to vessel length. In addition, nearly all the Lewin-type boats have a single hole in the bow and two at the stern. The low height is a result of the parent log being split lengthwise in half, in order to obtain two identical timbers from a single trunk. The advantage lies in the resulting identical twin hulls, which are then joined to form a double-hulled raft. The paired hulls were joined by transverse poles, which did not go through the holes in the platform ends but were fastened to the top walls or in special grooves at the hull ends. These vessels were typically 7–12 m in length, and the largest of them could carry up to 1.5 tons of cargo because of the special design.

Many pre-historic dugout boats have been found in Scandinavia. These boats were used for transport on calmer bodies of water, fishing and maybe occasionally for whaling and sealing. Dugouts require no metal parts, and were common amongst the Stone Age people in Northern Europe until large trees suitable for making this type of watercraft became scarce. In Denmark in 2001, and some years prior to that, a few dugout canoes of linden wood, was unearthed in a large-scale archaeological excavation project in Egådalen, north of Aarhus. They have been carbon dated to the years 5210-4910 BCE and they are the oldest known boats in Northern Europe. In Scandinavia, later models increased freeboard (and seaworthiness) by lashing additional boards to the side of the dugout. Eventually, the dugout portion was reduced to a solid keel, and the lashed boards on the sides became a lapstrake hull.

In the United Kingdom, two log boats were discovered in Newport, Shropshire, and are now on display at Harper Adams University Newport. The Iron Age residents of Great Britain, were known to have used longboats for fishing and basic trade. In 1964, a logboat was uncovered in Poole Harbour, Dorset. The Poole Logboat dated to 300 BC, was large enough to accommodate 18 people and was constructed from a giant oak tree. It is currently located in the Poole Museum. An even older logboat (the Hanson log boat) was unearthed in 1998 in Shardlow south of Derby. It has been dated to the Bronze Ages around 1500 BCE and is now exhibited at Derby Museum and Art Gallery. There was another pre-historic boat at the same location, but it was buried in situ.

In Northern Europe, the tradition of making dugout canoes survived into the 20th and 21st centuries in Estonia, where seasonal floods in Soomaa, a 390 km2 wilderness area, make conventional means of transportation impossible. In recent decades, a new surge of interest in crafting dugouts (Estonian haabjas) has revitalized the ancient tradition. I December 2021 dugout boat culture of Estonia’s Soomaa region was added to UNESCO’s Intangible Cultural Heritage list.

The Americas

Dugout canoes were constructed by indigenous people throughout the Americas, where suitable logs were available. 

The Native Americans of the Pacific Northwest were and are still very skilled at crafting wood. In the state of Washington, dugout canoes are traditionally made from huge cedar logs (such as Pacific red cedar) for ocean travellers, while natives around smaller rivers use spruce logs, the cedar logs have a resilience in salt water much greater than spruce.

In 1978, Geordie Tocher and two companions sailed a dugout canoe (the Orenda II), based on Haida designs (but with sails), from Vancouver, British Columbia, Canada to Hawaii. The mission was launched to add credibility to stories that the Haida had travelled to Hawaii in ancient times. Altogether, the group ventured some 4,500 miles (7,242 km) after two months at sea.

Oceania

Pacific Islands
The Pacific Ocean has been the nursery for many different forms of dugout sailing craft. They differ in their sail plan (i.e., crab-claw or half-crab-claw, Latin, or triangular), hull formats (single, double, catamaran or proa), the absence or presence of a beam (a bridge for a double hull). Hull shapes and end forms vary greatly. Masts can "be right or made of double spars." Hulls can be constructed by assembling boards or digging out tree trunks. Intended use (fish, war, sea voyage) and geographical features (beach, lagoon, reefs) are reflected in the design. Importantly, there is an important dividing line: some craft use a tacking rig; others "shunt" that is change tack "by reversing the sail from one end of the hull to the other." Tacking rigs are similar to those seen in most parts of the world, but shunting rigs change tack by reversing the sail from one end of the hull to the other and sailing in the opposite direction (the "Pushmi-pullyu" of the sailing world).

In the Pacific Islands, dugout canoes are very large, made from whole mature trees and fitted with outriggers for increased stability in the ocean, and were once used for long-distance travel.

New Zealand
The very large waka is used by Māori people, who came to New Zealand probably from East Polynesia in about 1280. Such vessels carried 40 to 80 warriors in calm sheltered coastal waters or rivers. It is believed that trans-ocean voyages were made in Polynesian catamarans and one hull, carbon-dated to about 1400, was found in New Zealand in 2011. In New Zealand smaller waka were made from a single log, often totara, because of its lightness, strength and resistance to rotting. Larger waka were made of about seven parts lashed together with flax rope. All waka are characterized by very low freeboard. In Hawaii, waa (canoes) are traditionally manufactured from the trunk of the koa tree. They typically carry a crew of six: one steersman and five paddlers.

Australasia

The Australian Aboriginal people began using dugout canoes from around 1640 in coastal regions of northern Australia. They were brought by Buginese fishers of sea cucumbers, known as trepangers, from Makassar in South Sulawesi. In Arnhem Land, dugout canoes are used by the local Yolngu people, called lipalipa  or lippa-lippa.

Torres Strait Islander people used a double outrigger, unique to their area and probably introduced from Papuan communities and later modified.

Solomon Islanders
The Solomon Islanders have used and continue to use dugout canoes to travel between islands. In World War II these were used during the Japanese occupation - with their small visual and noise signatures these were among the smallest boats used by the Allied forces in World War II. After the sinking of PT-109, Biuku Gasa reached the shipwrecked John F. Kennedy by dugout.

See also
 Log canoe
 Traditional fishing boat
 Tomol, Chumash plank-built boat

References

External links

 Fundamental origins of ship types
 Ship replicas in the world
 For more information on Tocher's voyage

Indigenous boats
Wood products
Canoes